Arnold Bell (23 May 1901 – 12 March 1988) was a British actor.

Selected filmography

 Convict 99 (1919) - Warder Gannawy
 Doctor Josser K.C. (1931)
 Josser in the Army (1932) - Becker
 Doss House (1933) - Reporter
 Jack of All Trades (1936) - (uncredited)
 His Lordship (1936) - Ibrahim's Butler (uncredited)
 Strange Experiment (1937) - Leech
 O.H.M.S. (1937) - Matthews (uncredited)
 The Greed of William Hart (1948) - Dr. Cox
 The Temptress (1949) - Dr. Leroy
 No Place for Jennifer (1950) - Judge
 Women of Twilight (1952) - Minor Role (uncredited)
 Appointment in London (1953) - Padre (uncredited)
 Rough Shoot (1953) - Sgt. Baines
 The Fake (1953) - Police Inspector
 Murder at 3am (1953) - McMann
 Star of India (1954) - Captain
 Bang! You're Dead (1954) - The Warder
 The Diamond (1954) - Police Chemist (uncredited)
 The Master Plan (1954) - Gen. Harry Goulding
 The Golden Link (1954) - Det. Insp. Harris
 Profile (1954) - Inspector Crawford
 Svengali (1954) - Tout
 Contraband Spain (1955) - Preventive Officer
 As Long as They're Happy (1955) - Ship's purser
 One Jump Ahead (1955) - Spt. Faro
 A Prize of Gold (1955) - Police Detective
 An Alligator Named Daisy (1955) - Customs Man (uncredited)
 Bond of Fear (1956) - Sergeant at Road Block
 Satellite in the Sky (1956) - Radio Commentator (uncredited)
 The Birthday Present (1957) - Green
 The Safecracker (1958) - Detective
 Dunkirk (1958) - Commander - Royal Navy (uncredited)
 Moment of Indiscretion (1958) - Surgeon
 Virgin Island (US: Our Virgin Island, 1958) - Heath
 The Square Peg (1958) - General Hunt
 Three Crooked Men (1959) - Mr. Brady (uncredited)
 Innocent Meeting (1959) - Fry
 High Jump (1959) - Tom Rowton
 Top Floor Girl (1959) - Stevens Sr.
 The Night We Dropped a Clanger (1959) - Wing Commander Jones
 Night Train for Inverness (1960) - Doctor on Train (uncredited)
 Sentenced for Life (1960) - Williams
 An Honourable Murder (1960) - Ligar
 Feet of Clay (1960) - Magistrate
 Fate Takes a Hand (1961) - Finch
 Nothing Barred (1961) - Prison Governor
 In the Doghouse (1961) - Magistrate (uncredited)
 The Pursuers (1961) - Luther's Colleague (uncredited)
 A Stitch in Time (1963) - Doctor (uncredited)
 Seance on a Wet Afternoon (1964) - Mr. Weaver (uncredited)
 Do You Know This Voice? (1964) - Desk Sergeant
 The Runaway (1964) - Staff Officer
 Troubled Waters (1964) - Attendant
 Three Hats for Lisa (1965) - Hilton Doorman
 Curse of the Fly (1965) - Hotel Porter

References

External links

1901 births
1988 deaths
English male film actors
English male silent film actors
Male actors from Yorkshire
20th-century English male actors